Cheavon Clarke (also named Cheavan Clarke, born 14 December 1990) is a Jamaican-born British professional boxer.

He competed for Jamaica in the 2014 Commonwealth Games. After that he changed his allegiance to Great Britain / England, then went on to win a silver medal in the 2017 European Championships.

In May 2019, Clarke was selected to compete at the 2019 European Games in Minsk, Belarus. He also competed at the 2019 World Championships in Yekaterinburg, Russia, where he lost by unanimous decision to Muslim Gadzhimagomedov in the quarterfinals.

Professional boxing record

Notes

References

1990 births
Living people
British male boxers
Jamaican male boxers
Black British sportspeople
English people of Jamaican descent
Jamaican emigrants to the United Kingdom
Commonwealth Games competitors for Jamaica
Boxers at the 2018 Commonwealth Games
Boxers at the 2014 Commonwealth Games
Commonwealth Games medallists in boxing
Commonwealth Games bronze medallists for England
Boxers at the 2019 European Games
European Games medalists in boxing
European Games bronze medalists for Great Britain
Heavyweight boxers
Boxers at the 2020 Summer Olympics
Olympic boxers of Great Britain
Medallists at the 2018 Commonwealth Games